Hydrophis viperinus, commonly known as the viperine sea snake, is a species of venomous sea snake in the family Elapidae (Hydrophiinae).

Diagnostic characters
Scales hexagonal, juxtaposed, in 27–34 rows on the neck, 37–50 at midbody; ventrals 226–274, anteriorly about half the width of the body, narrowing posterior to about twice the width of the adjacent scales, or slightly less; head shields entire, nostrils superior, nasal shields in contact with one another; prefrontals longer than broad, not in contact with upper labials; 1, rarely 2, pre- and 1–2 postoculars; 7-9 upper labials, 3–5 bordering eye (sometimes only 3–4 or 4–5); usually 1 anterior temporal, occasionally 2 or 3; body color, more or less bicolored, gray above, white below, the 2 usually clearly demarked on the sides, often with 25–35 dark rhomboidal spots, rarely with dark bands. Total length males 925 mm, females 820 mm; tail length males 100 mm, females 80 mm.

Distribution
Northern coasts of the Indian Ocean and western Pacific: from the Persian Gulf to around India to Indonesia and southern China. IUCN lists the following countries: Bahrain, Bangladesh, Cambodia, China, India (Andaman Is., Nicobar Is.), Indonesia, Iran Iraq, Japan, Kuwait, Malaysia, Myanmar, Oman, Pakistan, Philippines, Qatar, Saudi Arabia, Singapore, Sri Lanka, Taiwan, Thailand, United Arab Emirates, and Vietnam.

References

 Boulenger,G.A. 1888 Description of two new snakes from Hong Kong, and note on the dentition of Hydrophis viperina. Ann. Mag. nat. Hist.  (6) 2: 43-44
 Murray,J.A. 1887 Three New Species of Hydrophis. J. Bombay Nat. Hist. Soc. 2: 32–35.
 The Reptile Database (http://reptile-database.reptarium.cz/species?genus=Hydrophis&species=viperinus).

External links
 http://itgmv1.fzk.de/www/itg/uetz/herp/photos/Thalassophina_viperina.jpg
 http://itgmv1.fzk.de/www/itg/uetz/herp/photos/Thalassophina_viperina_juv.jpg

viperinus
Reptiles of Bangladesh
Reptiles of Myanmar
Reptiles of Cambodia
Reptiles of China
Reptiles of India
Reptiles of Indonesia
Reptiles of Iran
Reptiles of Japan
Reptiles of Malaysia
Reptiles of Pakistan
Reptiles of the Philippines
Reptiles of Sri Lanka
Reptiles of Taiwan
Reptiles of Thailand
Reptiles of Vietnam
Reptiles described in 1852
Snakes of China
Snakes of Vietnam
Snakes of Asia
Reptiles of Borneo